The Herbie Hancock Institute of Jazz is a non-profit music education organization founded in 1986. Before 2019, it was known as the Thelonious Monk Institute of Jazz, but was then renamed after its longtime board chairman, Herbie Hancock.

The institute has held its International Jazz Competition annually since 1987 and offered a full scholarship graduate-level college program since 1995. It organizes free jazz education programs in public schools throughout the United States and the world “to encourage imaginative thinking, creativity, a positive self-image and respect for one’s own and others’ cultural heritage.” It is also the lead non-profit responsible for coordinating the annual celebration of International Jazz Day, a United Nations initiative.

College program
One of the institute's earliest goals was to create a unique college-level jazz program where the masters of jazz could pass on their expertise to the next generation of jazz musicians. In September 1995, the Thelonious Monk Institute of Jazz Performance was launched and the first class of seven students began their intensive training with some of the world's greatest musicians. The performance institute was located at Loyola University New Orleans before relocating in 2011.

Now known as the Herbie Hancock Institute of Jazz Performance, the two-year, tuition-free program accepts one ensemble of musicians for each class. All of the students receive full scholarships, as well as stipends to cover their monthly living expenses. The students study both individually and as a small group, receiving personal mentoring, ensemble coaching, and lectures on the jazz tradition. They are also encouraged to experiment in expanding jazz in new directions through their compositions and performances. Alumni include Ambrose Akinmusire, Lionel Loueke, Michael Mayo, Helen Sung, Carmen Staaf, Walter Smith III, Wayne Escoffery, Eli Degibri and Gretchen Parlato. The institute is currently located at the Herb Alpert School of Music at the University of California, Los Angeles. In October 2021, the 13th class was announced, including eight young musicians from the United States and Russia.

In addition to their rigorous course of studies, students in the program perform regularly at venues throughout Los Angeles and serve as mentors and educators both in the local community and on Institute jazz education tours across the United States and internationally. Recent classes have visited Sitka, AK; Phoenix, AZ; Morocco, Havana, Cuba; Saint Petersburg, Russia; Panama City, Panama; and Melbourne, Sydney and Mt. Gambier, Australia.

Herbie Hancock Institute of Jazz International Competition
Since 1987, the institute has presented an annual international competition. More than $100,000 in scholarships and prizes is awarded to musicians and composers each year. The competition focuses on a different instrument every year and features a panel of judges. Branford Marsalis, Pat Metheny, Herbie Hancock, Christian McBride, Dee Dee Bridgewater, Dianne Reeves, Hugh Masekela, Arturo Sandoval, Ron Carter, Wayne Shorter, Clark Terry, Marian McPartland, Quincy Jones, and Diana Krall have all served as judges at past competitions.

The competition has been won by Joshua Redman, winner of the 1991 saxophone competition, Marcus Roberts, winner of the 1987 piano competition, Ryan Kisor, winner of the 1990 trumpet competition, and Joey DeFrancesco, a finalist in the 1987 piano competition. The 1993 piano competition winner, Jacky Terrasson, signed with Blue Note Records. The 1998 vocals competition produced: the late Teri Thornton, winner of the competition who signed with Verve Records; second-place winner Jane Monheit who signed with Columbia; semifinalist Tierney Sutton who signed with Telarc; and third-place winner Roberta Gambarini, whose American debut album, Easy to Love, was nominated for a 2007 Grammy for Best Jazz Vocal Performance, Female. Aaron Parks placed third in the piano competition of 2006 and was subsequently signed by Blue Note Records. Recent winners include GRAMMY Award-winning vocalist Cécile McLorin Salvant (2010), Emmy Award-winning pianist and composer Kris Bowers (2011), saxophonist Melissa Aldana (2013), vocalist Jazzmeia Horn (2015) and guitarist Evgeny Pobozhiy (2019). Dozens of other finalists and semifinalists have forged successful careers as jazz performers and educators.

Past winners

 1987: Marcus Roberts, Piano
 1988: Ted Rosenthal, Piano
 1989: Bill Cunliffe, Piano
 1990: Ryan Kisor, Trumpet
 1991: Joshua Redman, Saxophone
 1992: Harold Summey, Drums
 1993: Jacky Terrasson, Piano
 1994: Sara Lazarus, Vocals
 1995: Jesse van Ruller, Guitar; Darryl Hall, Bass
 1996: Jon Gordon, Saxophone
 1997: Darren Barrett, Trumpet
 1998: Teri Thornton, Vocals
 1999: Eric Lewis, Piano
 2000: Pedrito Martinez, Afro-Latin Hand Drums
 2001: competition not held
 2002: Seamus Blake, Saxophone
 2003: Andre Hayward, Trombone
 2004: Gretchen Parlato, Vocals
 2005: Lage Lund, Guitar
 2006: Tigran Hamasyan, Piano
 2007: Ambrose Akinmusire, Trumpet
 2008: Jon Irabagon, Saxophone
 2009: Ben Williams, Bass
 2010: Cécile McLorin Salvant, Vocals
 2011: Kris Bowers, Piano
 2012: Jamison Ross, Drums
 2013: Melissa Aldana, Saxophone
 2014: Marquis Hill, Trumpet
 2015: Jazzmeia Horn, Vocals
 2016: competition not held
 2017: competition not held
 2018: Tom Oren, Piano
 2019: Evgeny Pobozhiy, Guitar

Notable runners-up

 1987: Joey DeFrancesco, Piano
 1991: Chris Potter, Saxophone
 1992: Jorge Rossy, Drums
 1993: Peter Martin, Piano
 1993: Edward Simon, Piano
 1997: Avishai Cohen, Trumpet
 1998: Tierney Sutton, Vocals
 1998: Roberta Gambarini, Vocals
 1998: Jane Monheit, Vocals
 1999: Orrin Evans, Piano
 1999: Sam Yahel, Piano
 2002: John Ellis, Saxophone
 2002: Marcus Strickland, Saxophone
 2002: Jaleel Shaw, Saxophone
 2003: Marshall Gilkes, Trombone
 2006: Gerald Clayton, Piano
 2006: Aaron Parks, Piano
 2010: Cyrille Aimée, Vocals
 2013: Tivon Pennicott, Saxophone
 2015: Veronica Swift, Vocals

International Jazz Day

In November 2011, the United Nations Educational, Scientific and Cultural Organization (UNESCO) officially designated April 30 as International Jazz Day to celebrate jazz as a universal language and tool for diplomacy. International Jazz Day is chaired and led by UNESCO Director General Audrey Azoulay and jazz pianist/composer Herbie Hancock, who serves as a UNESCO Ambassador for Intercultural Dialogue. The institute is the lead nonprofit organization charged with planning, promoting and producing this annual celebration, which began in 2012.

International Jazz Day was established to bring together communities, schools, artists, historians, academics, and jazz enthusiasts all over the world to learn about jazz and its roots. This day seeks to raise awareness of the need for intercultural dialogue and mutual understanding; and also to reinforce international cooperation and communication. Each year on April 30, International Jazz Day celebrates jazz as a symbol for promoting peace, fostering dialogue among cultures, allowing freedom of expression, and reinforcing the role of youth for social change.

International Jazz Day is celebrated in more than 190 countries on all seven continents.

Other educational programs

Jazz in the Classroom
Since 1989, the institute has gone into public schools to provide music instruction and instrument training sessions for public school students in Los Angeles, New Orleans, and Washington, D.C., as well as thousands of students in urban, rural, and remote areas of the country. In recent years, the institute has reported a 100% high school graduation rate for students in the program, with more than 90% going on to college and more than 75% of graduating seniors securing significant college scholarships.

Performing Arts High Schools Jazz Program
This program brings jazz musicians and educators into public performing arts high schools in order to provide intensive jazz training to students. Through this performance-based program, music students receive instruction in composition, theory, improvisation, history, and musical styles, preparing them to attend leading college, university, and conservatory music programs. The program is offered at the following public performing arts high schools:

 Arts High School (Newark, NJ)
 Baltimore School for the Arts
 Booker T. Washington High School for the Performing and Visual Arts (Dallas, TX)
 Chicago High School for the Arts
 Duke Ellington School of the Arts (Washington, DC)
 Kinder High School for the Performing and Visual Arts (Houston, TX)
 Los Angeles County High School for the Arts
 Music and Performing Arts Academy at Hamilton High School (Los Angeles, CA)
 New Orleans Center for Creative Arts
 New World School of the Arts (Miami, FL)
 Ramon C. Cortines School of Visual and Performing Arts (Los Angeles, CA)
 Ruth Asawa San Francisco School of the Arts

BeBop to Hip-Hop
Begun in 2004 in the Los Angeles public schools, "Bebop to Hip-Hop" brings together jazz and hip-hop students under the direction of professional jazz musicians and hip-hop artists. Aspiring young musicians study improvisation, lyric writing, music theory, arranging, composition, turntable scratching, and sampling. Recent concerts included performances by Billy Childs, Herbie Hancock, DJ Spark, Doug E. Fresh, Kool Mo Dee, Chali 2na, Supernatural, and Bobby Watson. The free virtual edition of BeBop to Hip-Hop in summer 2020 served over 100 high school musicians from across the U.S. and internationally.

Math, Science & Music
Math, Science & Music uses music as a tool to teach math and science to K-12 and college students. The institute collaborates with math, science, music and education experts at Harvard, MIT, Johns Hopkins, New York University, the University of California Berkeley and other universities to offer a wealth of free engaging curricula, games, apps and other interactive online resources based on the platform's website, mathsciencemusic.org. Math, Science & Music was launched in 2016, with an event at the U.S. Department of Education hosted by Secretary of Education John King.

Jazz in America
Launched in 2000, Jazz in America is an internet-based jazz curriculum designed to be taught in 5th, 8th, and 11th grade public school American history and social studies classrooms in the United States. The curriculum examines the evolution of jazz styles, contributions of important performers, and musical techniques involved in the creation and performance of jazz. As of 2021, the institute notes that the program's public school touring component has directly reached more than 500,000 students and teachers through assembly programs and master classes led by renowned jazz artists including Herbie Hancock, Antonio Hart, Ingrid Jensen, Vanessa Rubin and Bobby Watson. In summer 2020, the institute offered a series of free, virtual webinars introducing students in grades 4–12 to the Jazz in America curriculum.

International programs

The institute's students and major jazz artists have traveled around the world as jazz ambassadors, presenting education programs throughout Europe, Asia, Africa, South America, and the Caribbean. Programs have included:
1995 tour of seven African nations (Eritrea, Ethiopia, Madagascar, Mauritius, Mozambique, South Africa, and Swaziland)
1996 tour of India and Thailand
1998 tour of Chile, Argentina and Peru
2001 tour of Egypt
2005 tour of Vietnam to mark the 10th anniversary of the United States and Vietnam resuming diplomatic relations
2009 tour of India commemorating the 50th anniversary of Martin Luther King's visit to study Mahatma Gandhi's nonviolence movement
2010 tour of China with Institute students performing at the 2010 Shanghai Expo and also in Beijing's Forbidden City Concert Hall.
2011 tour of Italy's Basilicata region.
2012 tour of Russia, with concerts in Moscow and St. Petersburg.
2013 tour of Stockholm, Sweden with master classes and performances at the Royal College of Music
2013 appearance by the institute's students alongside vocalist Jane Monheit at the Red Sea Jazz Festival in Eilat, Israel
2014 tour in Mexico, with educational workshops and performances at the Centro Nacional de las Artes and the Escuela Superior de Música
2015 tour of Morocco, with performances and workshops in Rabat and Marrakesh
2019 visit to the Generations in Jazz Festival in Mount Gambier, Australia, where the institute's students performed and taught along with artists including Joey DeFrancesco, Kurt Elling, Lizz Wright and others
2022 tour of Jordan, including engagement with local youth and performances at prominent archaeological sites 

For three years beginning in 2002, UNESCO sponsored a tour of Paris, where the institute's college students performed with Herbie Hancock, Wayne Shorter, Dianne Reeves, Dee Dee Bridgewater, and T.S. Monk at International Philosophy Day.

Institute of Jazz Performance students have also regularly appeared at the Panama Jazz Festival since 2008.

Television specials
The institute has produced a series of television specials to highlight the importance of jazz. In 1986, the institute produced "Celebrating a Jazz Master: Thelonious Sphere Monk," a PBS tribute concert hosted by Bill Cosby. In 1993, the institute coordinated "A White House Jazz Festival", the first "In Performance at The White House" PBS special taped with President and Mrs. Clinton. In 1996, the institute produced "A Celebration of America's Music", the first network television special devoted to jazz in over 25 years, which aired on ABC. A second "A Celebration of America's Music" aired in 1998. In 2006, President and Mrs. Bush hosted a concert celebrating the institute's 20th anniversary that aired as an "In Performance at The White House" PBS special hosted by Barbara Walters. In addition, the institute's international jazz competitions have been featured as documentaries on Black Entertainment Television and its affiliates.

More recently, in 2016 the institute produced a network television special in honor of the fifth anniversary of International Jazz Day on ABC, “Jazz at the White House,” filmed at the White House and hosted by President Barack Obama and First Lady Michelle Obama. The special was subsequently nominated for an Emmy for Outstanding Music Direction by John Beasley. Since 2012, the institute has produced television specials for PBS focusing on the annual celebration of International Jazz Day, with “International Jazz Day 2022” airing nationally in April 2022.

Artwork and donations by Billy Dee Williams
Billy Dee Williams has donated artwork that has been used as the cover of the institute's International Jazz Competition since 1990. The artwork corresponds with the instrument being featured in that year's competition.

References

External links

International Jazz Day website
Jazz in America website
Math, Science & Music website

1986 establishments in Washington, D.C.
Jazz music education
Jazz organizations
Music organizations based in the United States
Organizations established in 1986
Thelonious Monk
Herbie Hancock
University of California, Los Angeles
American jazz